Hussain Nooradeen Nasir (3 April 1969) is a Maldivian film producer and actor.

Career
Nooradeen initially appeared in small roles in films like Himeyn Dhuniye (2000) and office drama Hulhukolhu (2000), before expanding his career as a producer with studio albums including Boduraalhu (2001). In 2003, he played the role, Waheed, a businessman who is heartbroken in love and desperately waiting for a minor to grow up before asking her for marriage, in the television series, Ujaalaa Raasthaa. Co-directed by Mohamed Shareef and Muawiyath Anwar, it narrates the journey of two best friends in three generations. The series developed as an attempt to aware the audience on several social issues, was widely accepted by the audience and received positive reviews from critics. 

He next appeared in a small role in Mohamed Shareef-directed drama series Loabi Vaanama (2005) where he played the role of Waheed, an infedile husband. The first episode of the series was met with lukewarm response from the audience due to the different "visualization style" of the director and the scene arrangement by screenwriter. However, from the second episode onwards, the series picked up and become a success among the critics and audience.

The following year, he played the titular role in the short film Salhibe (2006) and was a part of the cast in the third and fourth installment of the Dheke Dhekeves. He also served as the producer for the first installment of the horror short film Vasvaas (2006) and Umurahvess Inthizaaru Kuraanan (2007). Apart from Salhibe,  he also produced and played the titular role in Seedhibe (2009). One of the most notable work of Nooradeen as a producer is Moomin Fuad-directed crime tragedy drama Loodhifa. Featuring an ensemble cast, the film deals with several social issues in the society told from different perspectives of the characters. Made on a budget of MVR 600,000, the film was declared a commercial failure though it received wide critical acclaim, praising the performance of cast and the film's "realism" in its language, characters and their attitude.

Filmography

Feature Film

Television and web series

Short film

Other work

References 

Living people
People from Malé
21st-century Maldivian actors
Maldivian film actors
1969 births